The  Osage Mission Infirmary, located at 325 Main St. in St. Paul, Kansas, was built in 1872 to serve as an infirmary for members of the Osage Nation.  It was moved in 1912 and then served as a private residence. It was listed on the National Register of Historic Places in 2005.

Known also as the Dodd House, it is Second Empire in style.

References

Hospital buildings on the National Register of Historic Places in Kansas
Second Empire architecture in Kansas
Buildings and structures completed in 1872
Neosho County, Kansas
Osage Nation
Native American history of Kansas